Rupert Leslie Lowell (30 August 1893 – 5 November 1980) was an Australian rules footballer who played with Essendon and Melbourne in the Victorian Football League (VFL).

Football

Melbourne (VFL)
He played his last VFL game for Melbourne two days after enlisting with the First AIF.

In May 1919, an unidentified former Melbourne footballer, wrote to the football correspondent of The Argus as follows:
"In 1914 the Melbourne football team, after its junction with the University, was a fine team, and succeeded in reaching the semi-finals.Out of this combination the following players enlisted and served at the front:—C. Lilley (seriously wounded), J. Hassett, H. Tomkins (severely wounded), J. Evans (seriously wounded), W. Hendrie, R. L. Park, J. Doubleday (died), A. Best, C. Burge (killed), C. (viz., A.) Williamson (killed), J. Brake, R. Lowell, E. Parsons (seriously wounded), A. M. Pearce (killed), F. Lugton (killed), A. George, C. Armstrong, P. Rodriguez (killed), J. Cannole (viz., Connole), A. Fraser (seriously wounded), T. Collins.These are all players of note, and in themselves would have formed a very fine side, but there is only one of them playing at the present time, viz., C. Lilley, who, as a matter of fact, takes the field under some disability owing to severe wounds which he received on service." — The Argus, 16 May 1919.

Death
He died at Portland, Victoria on 5 November 1980.

Notes

References

 Maplestone, M., Flying Higher: History of the Essendon Football Club 1872–1996, Essendon Football Club, (Melbourne), 1996.

External links 

 
 Rupe Lowell, at Demonwiki

1893 births
1980 deaths
Australian rules footballers from Victoria (Australia)
Essendon Football Club players
Melbourne Football Club players
Australian military personnel of World War I